The 1971 Air Canada Silver Broom, the men's world curling championship, was held from March 16 to 21 at the Palais de Sports in Megève, France.

Teams

*Throws third rocks.

Standings

Results

Draw 1

Draw 2

Draw 3

Draw 4

Draw 5

Draw 6

Draw 7

Tiebreaker

Playoffs

Semifinals

Final

References

External links
 

World Men's Curling Championship
Curling
Air Canada Silver Broom, 1971
International curling competitions hosted by France
Sport in Haute-Savoie
Air Canada Silver Broom